Bregmacerinia is an extinct genus of prehistoric bony fish that lived during the early part of the Miocene epoch.

Included in a book of Miocene fish:  "Miocene Fish:  Megalodon, Carcharocles Angustidens, Mene, Tunjice Hills Seahorse, Megapiranha, Lampris Zatima, Oncorhynchus Rastrosus"

See also

 Prehistoric fish
 List of prehistoric bony fish

References

Miocene fish